"Thumbs Up" is a song recorded by South Korean girl group Momoland. It was released on December 30, 2019 by MLD Entertainment and distributed by Kakao M as the group's single from their second single album of the same name. The track was written by Duble Sidekick, Bull$EyE, Ondine, De view and Kim Do Da Ri, with De view, Bull$EyE and Ondine credited as producers.

The accompanying music video for the song was uploaded onto 1theK's YouTube channel simultaneously with the single's release. To promote the single, the group performed on several South Korean music show programs, such as M Countdown and Inkigayo. Commercially, "Thumbs Up" peaked at number one hundred thirty-seven on South Korea's Gaon Digital Chart and at number four on the Gaon Album Chart.

Composition
"Thumbs Up" is a dance-pop song. It was composed and written by Duble Sidekick, Bull$EyE, Ondine, De view and Kim Do Da Ri. De view, Bull$EyE and Ondine served as the producers.

Background and release 

Momoland as a seven-member group, released the song "I'm So Hot" from their fifth extended play Show Me in April 2019. Following the release of "I'm So Hot", the group's studio album Chiri Chiri and the six-member single "Pinky Love" were released in Japan in September 2019. On November 29, 2019 members Yeonwoo and Taeha had officially left the group. On December 10 2019, MLD Entertainment announced that the group will return as a six-member group at the end of the year. While Daisy was still in discussion about her contract. On December 12, it was announced that the group will release a single album titled Thumbs Up with the single of the same name on December 30, 2019. The song was stated to have a "newtro" sound and "will show a new image" for the group.

Prior to the release of "Thumbs Up", teasers featuring photos of Momoland from the single album's photoshoot, and clips from the music video were released online in December 2019. The song was officially released on December 30, 2020 by MLD Entertainment and distributed by Kakao M as the group's second single album. An English version, a remix and an instrumental of "Thumbs Up" were included in the single album. The dance practice video was uploaded on January 16, 2020.

Critical reception
Seoul Beats described the song as "obvious shift for the group, away from blatant carnival fun towards a more retro, glam and sophisticated look and feel." The Kraze Magazine stated the song "showcased" the identity of the group – "an energetic, hard-working group of women while giving a re-introduction."

Commercial performance
In South Korea, "Thumbs Up" debuted and peaked at number one hundred thirty-seven on the Gaon Digital Chart for the week ending January 4, 2020, making it the fourth song from Momoland to enter the chart. It also charted at number twenty-nine on the Download Chart and at number one hundred seventy-six on the Streaming Chart. It dropped the following week.

While the single album debuted at number four on the Gaon Album Chart for the week ending January 4, 2020. In its second week, the album dropped to number sixty-seven and to number seventy-five in its third week. In its fourth and final week, the album dropped to number one hundred. It was the forty-first most selling album on the Gaon Album Chart for the month of January 2020 with 5,688 copies sold.

Music videos

The music video for "Thumbs Up" was uploaded to 1theK's official YouTube channel on December 30, 2019, in conjunction with the release of the single. The video features the group playing two sets of characters: express delivery workers and showgirls. Seoul Beats criticized the choreography calling it "disappointing, simple and repetitive" and that it was "clearly made to be viral." The Kraze Magazine stated the group "delivered" in the choreography, adding that it was "simple and easy to follow."

A "performance" version of the music video was published on January 3, 2020.

Live performances
Momoland promoted "Thumbs Up" by performing on several music programs in South Korea including Inkigayo, M Countdown, Music Bank, Show! Music Core and Simply K-Pop.

Track listing

Charts

Accolades

Music programs wins

Credits and personnel
Credits adapted from Melon.
 Momoland – vocals
 Duble Sidekick – composer, lyricist
 Bull$EyE – composer, lyricist, arrangement
 Ondine – composer, lyricist, arrangement
 De view – composer, lyricist, arrangement
 Kim Do Da Ri – composer, lyricist

Release history

See also 
 List of M Countdown Chart winners (2020)

References 

Momoland songs
2019 singles
2019 songs
Dance-pop songs
Kakao M singles
Korean-language songs